The 2022 Uber Cup group stage will be held at the Impact Arena in Bangkok, Thailand, from 8 to 11 May 2022.

The group stage will be the first stage of the tournament where only the two highest-placing teams in each of the four groups will advance to the knockout stage.

Draw
The original draw for the tournament was conducted on 1 April 2022, at 15:00 ICT, at Arnoma Grand Bangkok in Bangkok, Thailand. The 16 teams will be drawn into four groups each containing four teams and were allocated to four pots based on the World Team Rankings of 22 February 2022.

Group composition

Group A

Indonesia vs France

Japan vs Germany

Japan vs France

Indonesia vs Germany

Japan vs Indonesia

France vs Germany

Group B

Chinese Taipei vs Spain

China vs Australia

China vs Spain

Chinese Taipei vs Australia

China vs Chinese Taipei

Spain vs Australia

Group C

Denmark vs Malaysia

Thailand vs Egypt

Thailand vs Malaysia

Denmark vs Egypt

Thailand vs Denmark

Malaysia vs Egypt

Group D

South Korea vs United States

India vs Canada

India vs United States

South Korea vs Canada

South Korea vs India

Canada vs United States

References

Thomas Group stage